Egypt is scheduled to compete at the 2024 Summer Olympics in Paris from 26 July to 11 August 2024. Since the nation's debut in 1912, Egyptian athletes have appeared in every edition of the Summer Olympic Games except for two different occasions: the 1932 Summer Olympics in Los Angeles because of the worldwide Great Depression and the 1980 Summer Olympics in Moscow, as part of the United States-led boycott.

Competitors
The following is the list of number of competitors in the Games.

Shooting

Egyptian shooters achieved quota places for the following events based on their results at the 2022 and 2023 ISSF World Championships, 2023 African Championships, and 2024 ISSF World Olympic Qualification Tournament, if they obtained a minimum qualifying score (MQS) from 14 August 2022 to 9 June 2024.

Swimming 

Egyptian swimmers achieved the entry standards in the following events for Paris 2024 (a maximum of two swimmers under the Olympic Qualifying Time (OST) and potentially at the Olympic Consideration Time (OCT)):

References

Nations at the 2024 Summer Olympics
2024
2024 in Egyptian sport